The 1914–15 Northern Rugby Football Union season was the 20th season of rugby league football. It featured Huddersfield's "Team of all talents" which became the second team to win all four cups.

Season summary

The 1914-15 season began just a month after Britain had declared War on Germany following their invasion of Belgium in early August. Tensions across Europe had seen a full scale "World War" develop in late July but despite this the 1914-1915 season was played to its conclusion before competitive competition was finally suspended. In fact the season kicked off on 5 September, the same day the first big battle of World War I (the Battle of the Marne) began in which the Franco-British defeated the Germans.

Huddersfield finished the regular season on top of the league and added their third Championship by defeating Leeds 35-2 in the play-off final.

The Challenge Cup winners were Huddersfield who beat St Helens 37-3. In the final Huddersfield scored a Final’s record nine tries.

During their Cup run they recorded the largest win in any Cup Round when they trounced the amateurs of Swinton Park 119-2.

Wigan won the Lancashire League, and Huddersfield won the Yorkshire League. Rochdale Hornets beat Wigan 3–2 to win the Lancashire Cup, and Huddersfield beat Hull F.C. 31–0 to win the Yorkshire County Cup.

Championship

Championship play-off

Challenge Cup

Huddersfield defeated St. Helens 37-3 in the Challenge Cup Final, on 1 May, held at Watersheddings, Oldham before a crowd of 8,000.

This was Huddersfield’s second Challenge Cup win in as many Final appearances.

St Helens team - 
1 Bert Roberts, 2 Tom Barton, 3 Jimmy Flanagan, 4 Tom White, 5 Henry Greenall, 6 Matt Creevey, 7 Fred Trenwith, 8 George Farrimond, 9 Sam Daniels – Try, 10 James Shallcross, 11 William Jackson, 12 Tom Durkin, 13 William Myers

Sources
1914-15 Rugby Football League season at wigan.rlfans.com
The Challenge Cup at The Rugby Football League website

References

1914 in English rugby league
1915 in English rugby league
Northern Rugby Football Union seasons